1927 are an Australian pop rock band formed in 1987 with James Barton on drums, Bill Frost on bass guitar, his brother Garry Frost on guitar and keyboards, and Eric Weideman on vocals, guitar and keyboards. They were popular in the late 1980s and early 1990s with their major hit songs "That's When I Think of You", "If I Could", "Compulsory Hero" and "Tell Me a Story". Their multi-platinum number-one album, ...ish (1988) was followed by The Other Side (1990). At the ARIA Music Awards of 1989 they won two categories: Breakthrough Artist – Album for ...ish and Breakthrough Artist – Single for "That's When I Think of You". At the 1990 ceremony they won Best Video for "Compulsory Hero", which was directed by Geoff Barter. In 1992 the group released a third studio album, 1927, which reached the top 40; but they disbanded the following year. Weideman reformed 1927 in 2009 with a new line-up.

History

1984–1987: Formation
In 1984 guitarist and keyboardist Garry Frost had left Sydney-based pop rockers, Moving Pictures, after their second album, Matinée. Frost had co-written Moving Pictures' 1981 number-one hit "What About Me?". In late 1986 Frost was writing songs at his home studio for an unformed band project. In 1987, he was watching Nine Network's variety series Hey Hey It's Saturdays talent segment "Red Faces" when Eric Weideman appeared and performed a cover of The Police's hit single, "Roxanne". Prior to joining 1927 Weideman had played in various cover bands including, Mixed Feelings, before starting a brief solo career. He later recalled, "I had only just started performing on my own. I was playing at a pub in Melbourne ... Then a friend of mine dared me to go on 'Red Faces'". The pair were joined by Garry's brother Bill Frost on bass guitar and James Barton on drums and the band 1927 were officially formed. The band's name, 1927, was drawn from a hat of suggestions and was from a favourite saying by Garry, "I haven't done that since 1927".

1988–1989:...ish

After a year of seeking a recording contract, 1927 were signed by Charles Fisher for his label, Trafalgar Productions in 1988. With Fisher producing, the group recorded their debut single, "That's When I Think of You", which was released in July 1988 and peaked at No. 6 on the ARIA Singles Chart in September 1988. In October 1988 the band released their second single, "If I Could", which peaked at No. 4. In mid-November their debut album, ...ish was released. Rock music historian, Ian McFarlane, described it as "brimful of stirring, stately pop rock anthems". It peaked at No. 1 on the ARIA Albums Chart for four weeks and stayed in the Top 50 for 46 weeks. It was awarded 5× platinum certification – for shipment of more than 350,000 copies. As of 2002, it was in the top 10 of the most successful debut albums by Australian artists.

Two more top 20 singles from the album followed in 1989; "You'll Never Know" and "Compulsory Hero". In 1989 "That's When I Think of You" was released internationally, it peaked in the Top 50 on the United Kingdom Singles Chart, and just reached the United States Billboard Hot 100. At the ARIA Music Awards of 1989, 1927 won 'Breakthrough Artist – Single' for "That's When I Think of You" and 'Breakthrough Artist – Album' for ...ish. At the 1990 ceremony they won 'Best Video' for "Compulsory Hero", which was directed by Geoff Barter. The band added Charlie Cole on keyboards (ex-Moving Pictures) and toured Australia in support of the album and associated singles. By late 1989, they started work for their second album when Garry Frost announced he was leaving the band early the following year.

1990–1993: The Other Side and 1927

1927's founder Garry Frost was replaced by Dave Dwyer on guitars and keyboards and the band recorded The Other Side with Weideman as main songwriter, and Fisher and Garry producing. The Other Side, which peaked at No. 3 in July 1990, provided a Top 20 hit with "Tell Me a Story". McFarlane described the album as "full of lush, ambitious arrangements and well-crafted pop, but it lacked the charm and rousing choruses" of ...Ish". Barton left in 1992 to be replaced on drums by Phillip Campbell, and in November they released their eponymous third album, 1927 produced by Mark Opitz. 1927 reached the Top 40 and the lead single, "Scars", reached the Top 50 but the second single, "It Ain't Love", was less successful. 1927 were suffering financial and internal problems and disbanded in 1993.

1994–2008: Disbandment and The Very Best of 1927

In September 1996, a compilation album, The Very Best of 1927, was released, which included Weideman's debut solo single, "Nothing I Can Do". "Nothing I Can Do" peaked at No. 73 in Australia in 1997. Subsequently, Weideman performed as a solo artist.

1927 reformed periodically including for the Here and Now '80s revival tour in the early 2000s, Weideman also continued with his solo career performing in pubs.

2009–2018: Generation-i

In September 2009 the group re-issued ...ish as a digitally remastered edition featuring bonus live recordings of "Propaganda Machine" and "Compulsory Hero". The band, led by Weideman, reformed with Damien Cooper on drums, Craig Laird on lead guitar and backing vocals, and Simon Shapiro on bass guitar and backing vocals. On 17 June 2009 the band appeared on Mornings with Kerri-Anne and toured Australia during the latter half of the year into the start of 2010.  In March they supported Simple Minds and followed in June with the second leg of the 20...ish Anniversary Tour.

In early 2012, 1927 supported Roxette on The Australian leg of their Charm School tour and commenced pre-release orders for their forthcoming new studio album. In  commenced their Generation-i Tour across the Australian east coast. In June 2013, The Essential 1927 was released and peaked at number 96. Generation-i was officially released through Sony in August 2013. A limited edition DVD featuring performances from the Roxette tour was included with the CD.

2019–present: Paper Aeroplane
Shapiro and Cooper left the group in 2019. In October 2019, 1927 released a 3-track extended play, titled Paper Aeroplane and supported its release with an Australian tour. 

Laird left the band in 2022 after 12 years; he was the second longest serving member of 1927 behind front man Weideman.

Members

Current members
 Eric Weideman (1964);– lead vocals, guitar, keyboards, drums (1987–1993, 2009–present)

Former members
 James Barton – drums, backing vocals (1987–1992)
 Bill Frost – bass guitar, backing vocals (1987–1993)
 Garry Frost – guitar, keyboards, backing vocals (1987–1990)
 Charlie Cole – keyboards, backing vocals (1989–1992)
 Dave Dwyer – guitar, backing vocals, keyboards (1990–1993)
 Phillip Campbell – drums (1992–1993)
 Simon Shapiro – bass guitar, backing vocals (2009–2019)
 Damien Cooper – drums (2009–2019)
 Craig Laird – lead guitar, backing vocals (2009–2022)

Discography

Studio albums

Compilation albums

Extended plays

Singles

Awards and nominations

ARIA Music Awards
The ARIA Music Awards is an annual awards ceremony that recognises excellence, innovation, and achievement across all genres of Australian music. They commenced in 1987. 1927 have won three awards.

! 
|-
| rowspan="9"| 1989
| rowspan="3"| ...ish
| ARIA Award for Album of the Year
| 
| rowspan="9"|
|-
| ARIA Award for Breakthrough Artist – Album
| 
|-
| ARIA Award for Highest Selling Album
| 
|-
| "If I Could"
| ARIA Award for Highest Selling Single
| 
|-
| rowspan="2"| "That's When I Think of You"
| ARIA Award for Single of the Year
| 
|-
| ARIA Award for Breakthrough Artist – Single
| 
|-
| Charles Fisher for 1927 "That's When I Think of You"
| ARIA Award for Producer of the Year
| 
|-
| Jim Bonnefond for 1927 ...ish 
| ARIA Award for Engineer of the Year
| 
|-
| Eric Weideman for 1927 ...ish 
| ARIA Award for Best Cover Art
| 
|-
| rowspan="3"| 1990
| "Compulsory Hero"
| ARIA Award for Best Group
| 
| rowspan="3"| 
|-
| Geoff Barter for 1927 - "Compulsory Hero"
| ARIA Award for Best Video
| 
|-
| Charles Fisher for 1927 "Compulsory Hero"
| Producer of the Year
| 
|-
| rowspan="1"| 1993
| Doug Brady for 1927 - "Scar"
| Engineer of the Year
| 
| 
|-

References

General
  Note: Archived [on-line] copy has limited functionality.
Specific

External links
 
 
 
 [ 1927 discography] at Billboard

ARIA Award winners
Australian rock music groups
Musical groups disestablished in 1993
Musical groups established in 1987
Musical groups reestablished in 2009
Victoria (Australia) musical groups
1987 establishments in Australia